Metropolitan Routes in Johannesburg, also called Metro Roads or Metro Routes are designated with the letter M, and are usually major routes around Johannesburg and some areas declared part of Greater Johannesburg (including the town of Krugersdorp and the Ekurhuleni Metropolitan Municipality).

Table of M roads

See also
 National Roads in South Africa
 Provincial Roads in South Africa

Roads in South Africa
Transport in Gauteng

References  

Transport in Johannesburg